The Chevrolet S-10 Electric was an American electric-powered vehicle built by Chevrolet. It was introduced in 1997, becoming the world's first electric pickup truck from the original manufacturer, updated in 1998, and then discontinued. It was an OEM BEV variant of Chevrolet's S-10 pickup truck. The S-10 Electric was solely powered by electricity (batteries) and was marketed primarily to utility fleet customers.

Design
General Motors started with a regular-cab, short-box ( bed) S-10 pickup, with a base-level trim package plus a half-tonneau cover.
In place of a typical inline four cylinder or V-6 internal combustion engine, the Electric S-10 EV was equipped with an  three-phase, liquid-cooled AC induction motor, based on GM's EV1 electric coupe. The EV1 had a 100kW motor; GM reduced the S-10EV's motor output because of the additional weight and drag of the truck so as not to overstress the batteries.

Because the S10 EV shared its major powertrain components with the GM EV1, it used a front wheel drive configuration, as opposed to the rear wheel drive (two-wheel-drive) configuration of the gasoline-powered S10, as well as its closest competitor, the Ford Ranger EV.

Batteries
Similar to the Gen 1 EV1's, there were lead acid battery and nickel–metal hydride battery options. The 1997 Chevrolet S-10 EV used a lead acid battery pack. Manufactured by Delco Electronics, the  battery pack consisted of 27 cells, with one being designated as an "auxiliary" cell. These reportedly offered 16.2 kilowatt-hours for propulsion. In 1998, an Ovonic nickel–metal hydride battery (NiMH) pack was also available; these batteries were lighter and had a combined 29 kilowatt-hours of storage for a longer range. NiMH also has longer life but costs more than the lead acid option. The battery pack was located between the frame rails, beneath the pickup bed. On all battery types, a passive battery monitoring and management system was used; this meant that excess energy was wasted from cells with a higher charge, while the remainder of the cells reach the same state of charge.

Charging
The S-10 EV charges using the Magne Charger, produced by the General Motors subsidiary Delco Electronics. The inductive charging paddle is the model J1773 or the 'large' paddle. The small paddle can also be used with an adapter to properly seat it. The standard charger is a 240V 30A (6.6kW); there is also a 120V 15A 'convenience' charger, and a high-power fast-charge version. The vehicle's charging port is accessed by flipping the front license plate frame downwards. The system is designed to be safe even when used in the rain.

Efficiency
The acceleration time  was listed as 13.5 seconds (at 50 percent battery charge - the published literature stated that acceleration time was "even less" when the truck had a full charge).

The performance is much better for the 1998 model year with the nickel–metal hydride battery, at an approximately  range and an acceleration time of 10.9 seconds at 50% charge.

1997 MY GM S10 EV lead acid: 

Note: 1998 GM S10 EV NiMh numbers above are apparently wrong. This corresponds to the NiMH version of the vehicle having a  lighter battery pack than the lead-acid model.

1997 MY GM S10 EV lead acid:  (J1634) 
1998 MY GM S10 EV NiMH:  (J1634)

Instruments
Internally, the instrument cluster was exclusive to the Electric S-10, and featured only four gauges - a speedometer, a large "charge" gauge which reads from 'E' to 'F' like a fuel gauge, a voltmeter ranging from 220 to 440 volts, and a "power use" meter, which acts as an ammeter of sorts showing discharge during acceleration and charge during regenerative braking. The LCD display for the shifter was shortened to display only park, neutral, reverse, and drive, since the S-10 EV does not have the usual transmission.

Additional features
The S10 EV was developed from the base version of the gasoline-powered S10, and included similar standard equipment. Standard equipment for the S10 EV included an A/M-F/M stereo radio with two door-mounted speakers, air conditioning, a vinyl-and-cloth-trimmed bench seat, and dual airbags. For colder climates, a fuel-fired heater was standard, which is similar to engine block heater, and runs on diesel fuel from a  tank. The heater will operate when ambient temperature falls below .

Because battery performance varies greatly with temperature, the heat pump supplies cooling to the batteries during charging when necessary. Passive air recirculation is used during the driving cycle to equalize variations in battery temperature.

History
The S-10 EV was preceded by at least two commercially-marketed S-10 electric vehicle conversions performed by third parties:
 Solectria Corporation E-10 (introduced in May 1993 at the American Tour de Sol)
 U.S. Electricar Pickup (introduced in 1994)

1998 updates
While the standard S-10 moved to a redesigned front fascia in 1998, the S-10 Electric kept the same front fascia as the '94-'97, with the exception of composite headlamps in 1998 versus the previous year's sealed-beam headlamps. The interior was also updated in 1998 along with internal combustion models, adding a passenger side airbag, a new A/M-F/M stereo radio, new instrumentation with a digital odometer and trip meter, a new bench seat design, new interior door panels, and a new steering wheel with airbag cover. Aside from this header panel, a unique lower bumper valance, and a stylized 'Electric' decal on the bottom of the doors, there is little difference externally between the appearance of an Electric and a stock S-10. Any changes, however minimal, were reported to have had a positive influence on reducing the truck's aerodynamic resistance. These changes included a closed grille and a front air dam, belly pans beneath the front suspension, a seal between the cab and the pickup bed, and a half-length tonneau cover over the rear of the pickup bed.

Sales
Unlike the EV1, of the 492 S-10EVs assembled about 60 were sold to fleet customers, rather than just leased through restrictive programs, mostly due to the prior Department of Transportation crashworthiness evaluations done on stock S-10 pickups. As a result, a few Electric S-10s can still be found in use today. The fleet life of many of these ended in 2007 and 2008. The vehicles (around 440) that were not sold were eventually scrapped, similar to the fate of their EV1 siblings. The white S-10EVs can be seen mixed into the stacks of crushed EV1s in aerial shots toward the end of "Who Killed The Electric Car", most easily identified by their white color, and black half-tonneau covers.

The purposes of the vehicle, though, was primarily to explore the potential of electric truck early in the history of electric vehicles:

Recent uses
In 2004 GM converted an S-10 EV to rear-wheel drive, using prototype in-wheel electric motors instead of an under-hood motor.

See also 

 Ford Ranger EV, a contemporary competitor
 General Motors EV1, a car that shared the same technology.
 List of modern production plug-in electric vehicles

References

External links

Idaho National Laboratory operated for the U.S. Department of Energy's Office of Nuclear Energy, Science and Technology:
1997 Chevrolet S-10 with PbA Batteries
1998 Chevrolet S-10 with NiMH Batteries
Chevrolet S-10 Accelerated Reliability Report
mailing list for Chevrolet S10 electric truck enthusiasts

Production electric cars
S10 EV
Electric trucks
CARB's ZEV Mandate
Vehicles introduced in 1997